Peanut stew or groundnut stew, also known as maafe (Wolof, mafé, maffé, maffe), sauce d'arachide (French) or tigadèguèna is a stew that is a staple food in Western Africa. It originates from the Mandinka and Bambara people of Mali. 

'peanut butter sauce,' where tige is 'peanut,' dege is 'paste,' and na is 'sauce') in Bamanankan.

 is a sauce also used by Gambians, whose name has been borrowed from the Mandinka language. In Senegal  or domoda refers to flour-thickened soup or stew, which is different from mafe that uses peanut paste.  It is a favorite dish among several Senegal and Gambia ethnic groups. With the significant expansion of groundnut cultivation during the colonial period, maafe has also become a popular dish across West Africa, even outside West Africa such as in Cameroon and France.

Variants of the dish appear in the cuisine of nations throughout West Africa and Central Africa. It is very similar to groundnut soup. It may be prepared with lamb, beef, chicken, or without meat. In Ghana, this stew is usually eaten with fufu.

Variations
Recipes for the stew vary widely, but commonly include chicken, tomato, onion, garlic, cabbage, and leaf or root vegetables. Other versions include okra, corn, carrots, cinnamon, hot peppers, paprika, black pepper, turmeric, cumin, and other spices. Maafe is traditionally served with white rice (in Senegal, Mauritania and Gambia), fonio or to (millet dough) in Mali, tuwo or omo tuo (rice or millet dough) in Northern Nigeria, Niger, and Northern Ghana, couscous (as West Africa meets the Sahara, in Sahelian countries), or fufu and sweet potatoes in the more tropical areas, such as the Ivory Coast. Um'bido is a variation using greens, while Ghanaian maafe is cooked with boiled eggs.  A variation of the stew, "Virginia peanut soup", even traveled with enslaved Africans to North America.

The Gambia 
Domoda is a type of groundnut stew found in The Gambia. Domoda is prepared using ground peanuts or peanut butter, meat, onion, tomato, garlic, seasonal vegetables and spices. It has been described as one of the national dishes of The Gambia. Domoda is typically served over rice, and is also sometimes served over findi, a grain that is similar to couscous in consistency.

Gallery

See also

 Cuisine of Mali
 Cuisine of Senegal
 Kare-kare
 List of African dishes
 List of peanut dishes
 List of sauces
 List of stews
 Peanut soup

References

Further reading
Kitchen Window: My Changing Memories of Mafe, Afi-Odelia E. Scruggs. NPR.org, November 9, 2005
 EATS & DRINKS:Incomparable Senegalese, Tama Janowitz, New York Press, (nd).  Credits Maafe as a Malian dish.
 The Modern Soul of African Cuisine, Food Product Design news, 05/04/2007.
chicken and vegetables braised in peanut sauce. Gourmet Magazine,  January 2002.  Credits Maafe as a Bambara dish.

External links

Mafe recipe
variation of the Senegambian recipe
Um'bido recipe, variation of maafe
Malian recipe: Dorinda Hafner, A Taste of Africa (2002)
Senegalese maafe recipe, ascribing a Malian source
Mafe recipe, Ivory Coast variation
Maffé à la viande, with lamb 

Stews
Nigerian cuisine
Senegalese cuisine
Guinean cuisine
Malian cuisine
Gambian cuisine
Ghanaian cuisine
Ivorian cuisine
Mauritanian cuisine
Nigerien cuisine
Cameroonian cuisine
Peanut dishes
National dishes